Honk is an American rock band, based in Laguna Beach, California. It is best known for providing the soundtrack for the surf documentary film, Five Summer Stories.

Career
The band was formalized in 1970, recorded some demo songs, and then recorded their first album for a $1500 fee. It was the soundtrack for the "cinematic cult classic" surf film, Five Summer Stories. In the early 1970s they toured with The Beach Boys, Chicago, Jackson Browne and Dave Mason before splitting up in 1975. The band reformed in 1985 and continue to occasionally perform.

Members
 Will Brady (bass and vocals)
 Craig Buhler (saxophone, clarinet, and flute)
 Tris Imboden (drums)
 Richard Stekol (vocals and guitar)
 Beth Fitchet Wood (vocals and guitar)
 Steve Wood (keyboards and vocals)

Honk's drummer, Tris Imboden, has also been a member of several other notable groups. This includes the Kenny Loggins Band, which was featured in the Number One soundtracks for prominent 1980s films, Caddyshack and Footloose. He was also the drummer for the multi-platinum Chicago from 1990 until 2018.

As drummer for the Kenny Loggins Band, Tris Imboden would collaborate with Richard Stekol. Loggins and Stekol co-wrote "Mr. Night", which was published in the album Keep the Fire and later in the soundtrack for Caddyshack.

Steve Wood is an award winner for his work on the soundtracks for the IMAX movies Everest and The Living Sea.

Discography

Videography
(1994) Five Summer Stories, film soundtrack

References

External links
 
 
 
 
 
 

Musical groups established in 1970
Musical groups from Orange County, California